Impulse or Impulsive may refer to:

Science 
 Impulse (physics), in mechanics, the change of momentum of an object; the integral of a force with respect to time
 Impulse noise (disambiguation)
 Specific impulse, the change in momentum per unit mass of propellant of a propulsion system
 Impulse function, a mathematical function of an infinitely high amplitude and infinitesimal duration
 Impulse response, a system's output when presented with the impulse function in Electrical Engineering
 Impulse (psychology), a wish or urge, particularly a sudden one
 Impulsion, a thrust of a horse

Film and television 
 Impulse (1954 film), a thriller film starring Arthur Kennedy
 Impulse (1974 film), a thriller film starring William Shatner
 Impulse (1984 film), a science fiction film starring Meg Tilly and Tim Matheson
 Impulse (1990 film), a thriller film starring Theresa Russell
 Impulse (2008 film), a thriller film starring Angus Macfadyen
 Impulse (2010 film), an apocalyptic thriller film starring Chris Masterson
 Impulse (TV series), a 2018 American television series that streams on YouTube Premium
 "Impulse" (Star Trek: Enterprise), a third-season episode of Star Trek: Enterprise
 Impulse drive, a fictional form of propulsion in Star Trek

Print media
 Impulse (German magazine), a German monthly magazine
 Impulse (Steven Gould novel), a 2013 novel by Steven Gould
 Impulse (Hopkins novel), a 2007 young adult verse novel by Ellen Hopkins
 Impulse (Psionex), a Marvel Comics character by Fabian Nicieza and Mark Bagley
 Impulse (DC Comics), an identity shared by three comic book superheroes published by DC Comics: Bart Allen, Kent Shakespeare, and Iris West
 Science Fantasy (magazine), which was published for a while under the titles Impulse and SF Impulse

Music 
 Impulse (band), Bulgarian hard rock group
 Impulse! Records, a jazz recording label
 Impulse (Buck Hill album), 1995
 Impulse Drum and Bugle Corps, an Open Class Drum and Bugle Corps from Buena Park, California
 Impulse (Erra album), 2011
 "Impulse", a song by Northlane from Node, 2015
 "Impulsive" (song), a 1990 song by Wilson Phillips

Business 
 Impulse Airlines, a former Australian airline
 Impulse (retailer), an entertainment retailer in the UK
 Isuzu Impulse, a small sporty three-door hatchback sold from 1981 through to 1992
 Impulse (body mist), a body spray made by Unilever
 Impulse (software), a digital distribution system for computer games
 Impulse purchase (also impulse buying), an unplanned decision to buy a product or service made just before the purchase

Other 
 Impulse 21, an American sailboat design
 Impulse (dinghy), a 4.0 m sports sailing dinghy
 Impulse (roller coaster), a roller coaster at Knoebels Amusement Resort in Pennsylvania
 Impulsivity
 Irresistible impulse, a legal defense that claims that an accused should not be held responsible for his or her actions